Robert Morris  (born 1875) was a Welsh international footballer. He was part of the Wales national football team between 1900 and 1903, playing 6 matches. He played his first match on 24 February 1900 against Ireland and his last match on 28 March 1903 against Ireland.

His brothers, Charlie and John, were also Wales internationals.

See also
 List of Wales international footballers (alphabetical)

References

1875 births
Welsh footballers
Wales international footballers
Place of birth missing
Year of death missing
Association footballers not categorized by position